Aimo Pulkkinen (14 June 1928 – 5 May 2018) was a Finnish footballer. He played in eight matches for the Finland national football team from 1953 to 1958. He was also named in Finland's squad for the Group 2 qualification tournament for the 1954 FIFA World Cup.

References

1928 births
2018 deaths
Finnish footballers
Finland international footballers
Place of birth missing
Association footballers not categorized by position